

Walther Moritz Heinrich Wolfgang von Axthelm (23 December 1893 – 6 January 1972) was a German general (General der Flakartillerie) in the Luftwaffe during World War II who commanded the 1. Flakkorps.  He was a recipient of the Knight's Cross of the Iron Cross of Nazi Germany. Axthelm served with the Ministry of Aviation (Reichsluftfahrtministerium) from 12 January 1942 to the end of March 1945, holding the position of General der Flakwaffe (Inspector of Anti-Aircraft Artillery). Axthelm surrendered to American troops in 1945 and was interned until 1947.

Awards and decorations

 Knight's Cross of the Iron Cross on 4 September 1941 as Generalmajor and commander of the I. Flak-Korps

References

Citations

Bibliography

 

1893 births
1972 deaths
People from Hersbruck
People from the Kingdom of Bavaria
Luftwaffe World War II generals
German Army personnel of World War I
Recipients of the clasp to the Iron Cross, 1st class
Recipients of the Knight's Cross of the Iron Cross
German prisoners of war in World War II held by the United States
Military personnel of Bavaria
Reichswehr personnel
Generals of Anti-aircraft Artillery
20th-century Freikorps personnel
Military personnel from Bavaria